Falowiec (plural: falowce; from the Polish word fala, wave) is a block of flats characterised by its length and wavy shape. This type of building was built in Poland in the late 1960s and 1970s in the Polish city of Gdańsk, where there are eight buildings of this type. Some buildings of this kind are also present in Italy.

The best-known falowiec in Gdańsk, located at the Obrońców Wybrzeża street, has:
11 stories (10 plus the ground floor)
nearly 6,000 occupants
4 segments (4 staircases in each segment of 110 apartments).
a length of around 850 m (2788 ft)

It was featured in the 5th episode of The Amazing Race 23 as part of a roadblock.

See also

Byker Wall, Newcastle upon Tyne, UK
Corviale, Rome, Italy
Prora, Rügen, Germany
Park Hill, Sheffield, UK
Karl Marx-Hof, Vienna, Austria

External links
 Falowce in Gdańsk via satellite

Architecture in Poland
House types